The Zavodskaya Line was a freight railway in Russia. The railway was opened in May 1916 for transportation to the Sestroretsk armory. The rolling stock was leased from Finnish railways. The start of World War I was the initial reason for the construction of the railway. The length of the line passed entirely on the territory of the Russia.

Construction
The line partially used old lines from the Sestroretsk spur line:
 In that part where the Sestra river forms the frontier, the railroad tracks go on the Russian side.
 Further, in that part where both coasts are Russian, the line crosses the river at Sestra crossover.
 The Sestroretsk station also lies along the Sestroretsk spur line.

Closure
The line existed for only a brief period. After the Russian Revolution (1917), the Sestroretsk armory practically stopped production, and in the 1920s, there was a complication of relations between the USSR and Finland. The bridge was destroyed, and the line was disassembled.

Partial re-opening
Later, the part of a line from the bridge straight across the Sestra river was restored and was a part of the Sestroretsk direction.

References 

Railway lines in Russia
Rail lines by company